James Francis Moroney (December 4, 1883 – February 26, 1929) was an American professional baseball player. His professional career spanned from 1904 to 1914, making 25 appearances and throwing 92.2 innings in the majors. These included stints with the Boston Beaneaters, Philadelphia Phillies and Chicago Cubs.

Sources

1883 births
1929 deaths
Major League Baseball pitchers
Boston Beaneaters players
Chicago Cubs players
Philadelphia Phillies players
Baseball players from Massachusetts
Lowell Tigers players
Oswego (minor league baseball) players
Lawrence Colts players
Rochester Bronchos players
Baltimore Orioles (IL) players
Providence Grays (minor league) players
Utica Utes players
Scranton Miners players
Wilkes-Barre Barons (baseball) players